The Storm House (Danish: Den Stormske Gård), also known as Anna Sophie Reventlow House, is a listed property in Slotsholmsgade on the island of Slotsholmen in central Copenhagen, Denmark.

History
The house was built in 1696 but was later expanded to the west. The building later belonged to Frederick IV, who used it first for his mistress Countess Schindel and later for his morganatic wife Anne Sophie Reventlow.

The building was taken over by the central administration in 1731. It was connected to the Chancerry House in 1781 and also expanded with an extra floor for the Rentekammeret. The building was listed in 1945.

Today
The building currently houses part of the Ministry of Finance.

References

External links

Listed residential buildings in Copenhagen
Listed government buildings in Copenhagen
Listed office buildings in Copenhagen
Slotsholmen